TDK Macassette (born September 22, 1992), whose real name is Thandeka Nompumelelo Mkhwanazi, is a South African dancer, singer, radio host and media personality. She got her break in the music industry when she provided corporate services to DJ Maphorisa after they had been to a corporate gig. She is the founder of a communication management company called Tdeeiosion.

Early life and education
TDK Macasette was born in Durban, South Africa. She obtained her BTech in Communications Management at Durban University of Technology.

Career
She began her career hosting a youth show at Ukhozi FM at the age of fourteen. Though she served as a radio host, she was fond of dancing at a young age. She pursued her love for dancing after being motivated by her parents. She then began appearing in tours with HHP as a part of his female dance squad in his Gauteng tours. 

In February 2018, she signed to Universal Music. Her debut single "Domoroza", was released through the record label. Shortly after its release she performed the single on Channel O.

She was involved in the production of DJ Maphorisa’s "iWalk Ye Phara", before she was controversially replaced on the remix by singer Moonchild Sanelly., Later that same year, she released a single titled "Zama", which featured rapper Okmalumkoolkat.

In May 2019, she released her single "Left Right". As a dancer, she was featured on Prince Kaybee’s music video for "Gugulethu". Later that year, she traveled to Germany for her European Tour alongside amapiano producer, Kabza De Small, the tour marked her first ever international tour. She has also performed at local music festivals such as the Dubane Spring Break and Gamalakhe Music Festival. She also performed during the South African opposition political party, Democratic Alliance manifesto launch at The Rand Stadium in Johannesburg. She has appeared on the SABC 3 television show, Afternoon Express.

In October 2020, she released her single "Mashobana".

Awards and nominations

References

External links
 
TDK Macasette on Discogs

Living people
South African dancers
21st-century South African women singers
1992 births
People from Durban